Topkapi is an album of motion picture and television themes by organist Jimmy McGriff recorded and released by Sue Records in 1964.

Reception 

The Allmusic review by Michael Erlewine stated "The orchestra sounds like Muzak, but McGriff sounds like McGriff. How the two got together is anyone's guess".

Track listing 
 "The Man with the Golden Arm" (Elmer Bernstein) – 2:24
 "Mr. Lucky" (Henry Mancini) – 2:30
 "Topkapi" (Manos Hadjidakis) – 2:28
 "Rawhide{" (Dimitri Tiomkin, Ned Washington) – 2:10
 "Exodus Main Theme" (Ernest Gold) – 2:00
 "People" (Jule Styne, Bob Merrill) – 2:26	
 "Woman of Straw" (Norman Percival) – 2:40
 "From Russia with Love" (Lionel Bart) – 2:30
 "A Taste of Honey" (Ric Marlow, Bobby Scott) – 2:13
 "Love Theme from "The World of Suzie Wong"" (George Duning) – 2:13
 "Medic Theme" (Victor Young) – 2:02
 "The Pink Panther Theme" (Mancini) – 2:02

Personnel 
Jimmy McGriff – organ
Unidentified orchestra arranged by Fred Norman

References 

1964 albums
Jimmy McGriff albums
Sue Records albums